Andrea Lucchetta (born November 25, 1962) is an Italian former volleyball player who was World champion with his national team in 1990. He was born in Treviso, Italy, and is nicknamed "Crazy Lucky" for his bizarre hair style.

Standing at 199 cm (6'6"), he played as middle blocker/hitter. Lucchetta debuted in Italian Major League in 1982 with Panini Modena, where he remained until 1990, winning five Italian titles and one European Champions Cup.

With the Italian team he gained 292 caps, winning a World Title, a European title (1989), and three World Leagues (1990, 1991 and 1992).

He's also the creator of the Italian animated series Spike Team.

Lucchetta won MVP award in World Championship 1990.

Olympics

In 1984 he was part of the Italian team which won the bronze medal in the Olympic tournament. He played all six matches.

Four years later he finished ninth with the Italian team in the 1988 Olympic tournament. He played one match.

At the 1992 Games he was a member of the Italian team which finished fifth in the Olympic tournament. He played all eight matches.

Clubs

External links
 
 
 
 Proile at legavolley.it 

1962 births
Living people
Italian men's volleyball players
Olympic volleyball players of Italy
Volleyball players at the 1984 Summer Olympics
Volleyball players at the 1988 Summer Olympics
Volleyball players at the 1992 Summer Olympics
Olympic bronze medalists for Italy
Sportspeople from Treviso
Olympic medalists in volleyball
Medalists at the 1984 Summer Olympics